Turn: Washington's Spies (stylized as TURИ: Washington's Spies) is an American period drama television series developed by Craig Silverstein and based on Alexander Rose’s book Washington's Spies: The Story of America's First Spy Ring (2007), a history of the Culper Ring. The series aired on AMC from April 6, 2014, through August 12, 2017.

Series overview

Episodes

Season 1 (2014)

Season 2 (2015)

Season 3 (2016)

Season 4 (2017)

Ratings

References

External links 

Lists of American drama television series episodes